Hidden Beach may refer to:

Organizations 
 Hidden Beach Recordings, a company headquartered in Beverly Hills, California, United States

Places  
 Hidden Beach, a location within Islas Marietas National Park in Mexico
 Hidden Beach, the former name of Cedar Lake East Beach in Minneapolis, Minnesota, United States